Klenak may refer to:

 Klenak, Nikšić, Montenegro
 Klenak, Ruma, Serbia
 Klenak, a neighbourhood of Kaluđerica, Serbia